Orange County Plaza, later Garden Grove Mall, Garden Promenade, now The Promenade at Garden Grove, was, upon its expansion in 1959, with sixty stores, the largest shopping center in Orange County, California, and at the time billed itself as "Orange County's first regional shopping center". However, Anaheim Plaza had in fact already opened In 1955, four years prior, and had an anchor department store (The Broadway).

The open-air shopping center is located at Chapman Avenue and Brookhurst Street in Garden Grove, California, a Los Angeles suburb of 171,644 (2019 estimate).

History
The center was announced in 1956 and was to cost $10,000,000. In 1956 and 1958, the project announced that Penney's, Newberry's and Grant's would locate in the Plaza, as well as the first branch of Rankin's department store of Santa Ana, which was to measure  – however, Rankin's never did wind up opening a branch there.

First phase (opened 1956)
Thriftimart supermarket
Economart drugstore

Second phase (opened 1959)
This phase added the anchor stores:
 a  W. T. Grant variety store
 a  Safeway supermarket, which moved from across the street
 a  Thrifty Drug Store (later became Rite Aid in 1998)
 a  Hartfield's junior department store

1979 renovation
in 1979 the center was known as Garden Grove Mall. There was a $5 million renovation of the mall in 1979 with new anchors National Lumber, and a new branch of Huntington Park-based  Wineman's Department Store that opened in the east end of the mall in the fall of that year. Wineman's operated until acquisition of the chain by Boston Stores in 1984, when some of their branches were converted to Boston Stores. Additional stores that were added were McDonald's, Straw Hat Pizza, Citizens Savings and Loan, Bank of America and See's Candies.

The Promenade at Garden Grove today
The site continues to function as a shopping center called The Promenade at Garden Grove. With  of gross leasable area it classifies as a community shopping center a.k.a. "large neighborhood center".  Anchors are Garden Grove's second Walmart (opened July 16, 2014, formerly Costco which opened in 1987 and relocated in 1994), a 16-screen Regal Cinemas, Marshalls, Ross Dress for Less, 24 Hour Fitness, Aldi, Petsmart and Dollar Tree.

References

Shopping malls in Orange County, California
Buildings and structures in Garden Grove, California
History of Orange County, California